Rahul Yadav (born 15 January 1989) is an Indian cricketer. He plays first-class cricket for Delhi.

See also
 List of Delhi cricketers

References

External links
 

1989 births
Living people
Indian cricketers
Delhi cricketers
Cricketers from Ghaziabad, Uttar Pradesh